Mikko Hietanen (1911–1999) was a Finnish long-distance runner, European Champion and world record holder, who competed for his native country at the Summer Olympics in London 1948 and in Helsinki 1952.

Biography 
Mikko Hietanen was born in Uusikirkko, Karelia, 22 September 1911.  He died in Laukaa, Central Finland, 3 February 1999.

Career 
Hietanen is best known for winning the gold medal in the men's marathon at the 1946 European Championships in Oslo, Norway.

In Oslo 1946, the marathon race took place on 22 August, which was the first day of the championships. At the same time, the final of the 10000 meter race was being held. As Viljo Heino of Finland was running towards victory in the 10000 meters, his fellow countryman Mikko Hietanen entered Bislett Stadium as leader of the marathon. Inside the stadium, the marathon runners were running clockwise to the finish line using the outside lane. It so happened, that Heino and Hietanen met each other on the track as they were both running towards victory.

In the marathon, Mikko Hietanen had the fastest time in the world in 1946, 1947 and 1948. During his career, he set six new world records at distances between 15 miles and 30000 meters.

Mikko Hietanen was not very successful in the Olympic Games. He took part in the marathon in London 1948, but did not finish the race due to promblems with his Achilles tendon. Four years later, on home soil in Helsinki, he finished in 17th place.

Hietanen became Finnish champion in marathon four years in a row between 1945 and 1948.

Achievements

World records
25,000 m world record with 1:20.58,8 in Vuoksenniska, 17 June 1946
25,000 m world record with 1:20.14,0 in Kokkola, 23 May 1948
30,000 m world record with 1:40.49,8 in Jyväskylä, 28 September 1947
30,000 m world record with 1:40.46,4 in Jyväskylä, 20 June 1948
15 miles world record with 1:17.28,6 in Kokkola, 23 May 1948
20 miles world record with 1:49.20,8 in Jyväskylä, 20 June 1948

References

1911 births
1999 deaths
People from Vyborg District
People from Viipuri Province (Grand Duchy of Finland)
Finnish male long-distance runners
Finnish male marathon runners
Athletes (track and field) at the 1948 Summer Olympics
Athletes (track and field) at the 1952 Summer Olympics
Olympic athletes of Finland
European Athletics Championships medalists